Koichi Suzuki (born 7 January 1956) is a Japanese professional golfer.

Suzuki played on the Japan Golf Tour, winning four times.

Professional wins (4)

Japan Golf Tour wins (4)

Japan Golf Tour playoff record (0–1)

Team appearances
World Cup (representing Japan): 1987
Four Tours World Championship (representing Japan): 1986 (winners), 1989
Dunhill Cup (representing Japan): 1987, 1989

External links

Japanese male golfers
Japan Golf Tour golfers
Sportspeople from Shizuoka Prefecture
1956 births
Living people